The European Junior Squash Championships are the event which serves as the European junior championship for squash players organised by the European Squash Federation.

Past results

Junior Individual Championships

Boys U19

Girls U19

Junior Team Championships
Countries enter teams of three players to represent them in the championships with two boys and one girl. In each round of the competition, teams face each other in a best-of-three singles matches contest.

See also 
 World Junior Squash Championships
 European Squash Federation
 European Squash Individual Championships
 European Squash Team Championships

External links 
 European Junior Squash Championships website Archive Results

European championships
Squash in Europe
Squash tournaments